Jerod Albert Haase (born April 1, 1974) is an American college basketball coach who is the head coach for Stanford Cardinal men's team of the Pac-12 Conference.  Haase played college basketball at the University of California, Berkeley from 1992 to 1993, and then transferred to the University of Kansas to play under Roy Williams from 1994 to 1997. Haase was a Naismith and Wooden Award candidate while at Kansas.  At Kansas, he only missed two games out of 101 and averaged 12.5 points per game, scoring 1,246 points over the span of his career.  He was a member of the Big Eight all defensive team as a junior, and played at the World University Games in 1995. He then spent 13 years as an assistant under Williams at both Kansas and North Carolina before starting his own head coaching career.

Early life
Born and raised in South Lake Tahoe, California, Haase is one of five siblings, all of whom have played an intercollegiate sport. Haase played high school basketball with long time NBA executive Chris Grant, former general manager of the Cleveland Cavaliers, at South Tahoe High School. Haase and his South Tahoe High School team faced off against their larger rival Western High for the state title in consecutive years, with South Tahoe winning in Haase's senior year in one of the most notable contests in state basketball history.

In Haase's junior year recruiters started to notice his ability, and he was invited to many college showcase camps.  Haase attended the Stanford High Potential Camp where he spent time with Stanford guard Kenny Ammon honing his skills and was named the camp MVP.  Stanford was one of the first schools to show interest in Haase when he won the Nevada AAA Player of the Year, but during Haase's senior year the University of California, Berkeley expressed major interest in Haase along with former NBA player and current NBA coach Jason Kidd.  Haase signed a letter of intent to play for California before his senior season of high school because of the proximity to his home, and he wanted to play in a major conference.

College career

California
Haase attended the University of California, Berkeley to play during the 1993 season.  Haase moved into the starting lineup and averaged 12 points and three assists through the first ten games for the California Golden Bears.  During his freshman season at Cal, after a game against USC, Haase got a phone call from his mother saying that she took his father, to the hospital because of an infection near his ankle. Gary Haase went into shock while in the hospital and died right before Haase played a game against UCLA. Later in his freshman season at Cal, his coach Lou Campanelli was fired and interim (and later permanent) coach Todd Bozeman was brought in.  Haase was benched and the Bears finished the regular season winning 9 of their last 10 games to reach the NCAA tournament.  Haase scored thirteen points in California's upset of powerhouse Duke in the second round. After the season ended, Haase transferred from California to the University of Kansas.

Kansas
Haase arrived at Kansas and contributed immediately. During his sophomore season he was named the Big Eight newcomer of the year and a second team all-conference selection. He also led the Jayhawks in scoring with 15.0 points per game. In Haase's junior year he scored his career best 30 points against the Temple Owls.  He was also named to the Big Eight all defensive team that year. The Jayhawks went 34–2 in the 1996–97 season, Haase's final year.  He was named a co-captain and was in the starting lineup with Jacque Vaughn, Scot Pollard, Raef LaFrentz and Paul Pierce.  Haase averaged 12.0 points per game his senior year and was named a Wooden and Naismith award finalist despite playing several games with a broken wrist. Haase's Kansas career came to an end on March 21, 1997, when Kansas lost to the Arizona Wildcats in the NCAA tournament. He started 99 of 101 games with the Jayhawks and his record in three years with the Jayhawks was 89–13. The Jayhawks also won three consecutive conference titles with Haase. The Jayhawks were ranked anywhere from fifth to first in the rankings during Haase's three years, and were named one of the favorites to win the 1996–97 national championship.

After college career
After Haase's senior season he co-wrote a book entitled Floor Burns with author Mark Horvath.  The book describes the 1996–1997 season when the Jayhawks were ranked number one for 15 consecutive weeks but lost to Arizona in the NCAA tournament.  Haase then had a brief career playing professional basketball in Macedonia.  When his short career in Macedonia ended he decided to self-publish his book Floor Burns and revisit towns around Kansas giving instructional basketball camps. Haase visited around 40 towns and conducted over 100 basketball camps.  He then decided to turn his focus to coaching.

Coaching career

Kansas
Haase broke into coaching with his former coach Roy Williams at his former school, Kansas. Haase along with his roommate at Kansas, C.B. McGrath, split time working on the sidelines with Coach Williams or working behind the scenes. Haase spent four years as an assistant to Roy Williams at Kansas before Williams decided to leave Lawrence, Kansas for Chapel Hill, North Carolina and take the North Carolina coaching job.

North Carolina
Haase followed Williams to North Carolina where he coached under Roy Williams for eight years. Haase had many responsibilities in Chapel Hill including coaching the North Carolina Tar Heels junior varsity basketball team. The Junior Varsity team plays a 14-game schedule against local competition as well as outside programs wanting to give their kids a chance to play in the Dean Smith Center. Haase had to pick 14 students out of a 70-student try-out camp to complete the junior varsity squad. Haase coached the JV team for three years to help prepare him for a head coaching job. Haase won 255 out of 317 games in nine seasons as an assistant coach for Roy Williams, with both Kansas and North Carolina.

UAB
On March 26, 2012, Haase was named head coach at the University of Alabama at Birmingham (UAB).

Haase managed to get UAB back to the big dance in his third year in Birmingham. The Blazers, a 14 seed, upset third-seeded Iowa State in the 2015 NCAA tournament before losing to UCLA in the round of 32.

His final season saw the Blazers win a conference title, but a loss in the conference tournament relegated them to the NIT.

Stanford
On March 25, 2016, Haase was named head coach at Stanford University, replacing Johnny Dawkins. In the 2017–18 season, Haase's second as head coach, he led Stanford to 11 conference wins, the most by the Cardinal since 2008.

Personal life
Haase married Mindy Meidinger in 1999. In 2006 they had a son, Gavin; in 2009 another son, Garrett; and in 2012 a daughter, Gabrielle.

Head coaching record

References

External links
 Stanford profile

1974 births
Living people
American expatriate basketball people in North Macedonia
American men's basketball coaches
American men's basketball players
Basketball coaches from California
Basketball players from California
California Golden Bears men's basketball players
College men's basketball head coaches in the United States
Kansas Jayhawks men's basketball coaches
Kansas Jayhawks men's basketball players
North Carolina Tar Heels men's basketball coaches
People from South Lake Tahoe, California
Sportspeople from Greater Sacramento
Stanford Cardinal men's basketball coaches
UAB Blazers men's basketball coaches
Universiade gold medalists for the United States
Universiade medalists in basketball
Medalists at the 1995 Summer Universiade